Ivan Martins Pinheiro (born 18 March 1946) is a Brazilian politician, former General Secretary of the Brazilian Communist Party (PCB) from 2005 to 2016 and a candidate in the 2010 presidential election. He also ran for mayor of Rio de Janeiro in 1996.

Pinheiro was born in Rio de Janeiro, then capital of Brazil, and started his political life as a student leader at the Pedro II College, the most important college in the country. He was president of the student board and was arrested for his political activism.

In 1964, when the military installed their dictatorship, Pinheiro was admitted to Law School at the State University of Guanabara (currently UERJ). There, he joined the MR-8, then the most important urban guerrilla in Brazil, and connected to the Communist Party of Brazil. Again he was elected as chair of the student board (Centro Acadêmico Luiz Carpenter).

In 1976, hired by the Banco do Brasil, he brought his Communist advocacy into the labor union of bank employees. In 1978, he was elected chairman of the union of bank workers of Rio de Janeiro, and became a union boss at the same time that Lula was heading the metalworkers in São Paulo. He was elected to the Central Committee of the Party in 1982.

In 1986, he ran for Congress for PCB, but wasn't elected. The next year, he led the party into joining the CUT union federation, which was allied with Lula and his newly founded Worker's Party. In 1989, then secretary-general of the party, Roberto Freire, ran for president of Brazil and Pinheiro supported him. Eventually, they both supported Lula in the run-off.

In the early 1990s, after the fall of the Iron Curtain, the PCB held a congress in which Freire and a group of Central Committee veterans had approved the self dissolution of the party. In January 1992, the remnants of PCB formed the People's Socialist Party (PPS), which increasingly moved rightwards in the political spectrum. Pinheiro then led a group of Marxist–Leninist who re-founded the PCB as a new, yet minor party, in late 1992.

In 2000 and 2004, Ivan Pinheiro ran for city counselor, but was not elected.

During the presidential elections of 2002, Pinheiro and the PCB supported Lula, who was elected president of Brazil.

At the 13th Congress of the PCB, in 2005, in Belo Horizonte, Ivan Pinheiro was elected secretary-general, and the party broke up with Lula. They also abandoned the goal of reunification with the PCdoB.

In 2006, the PCB supported Heloísa Helena for president and Pinheiro ran for congress once more, but again wasn't elected.

References

 ROEDEL, H. (2000) Atitude subversiva: biografia de Ivan Pinheiro. Fundação Dinarco Reis.

1949 births
Brazilian Communist Party politicians
Living people
Rio de Janeiro State University alumni